Norman Rimmington  (29 November 1923 – 29 December 2016) was an English footballer who played in the Football League for Barnsley and Hartlepool United.

Career
Rimmington was born in Staincross and began work in the local pit whilst playing amateur football with Mapplewell Town. He joined Barnsley in 1945 on 'amateur terms' but signed professionally for the Tykes upon the resumption of league football (following WW2's conclusion) in 1946. He spent one season with Barnsley before joining Hartlepool United. He spent five years at Hartlepool making 124 league appearances before returning to Yorkshire to play for Denaby United. After end his playing career Barnsley manager Tim Ward handed Rimmington a coaching role at the club. From then he worked as groundsman, then became a chartered physio before taking up the role as kit man at Oakwell. Rimmington was still working at Oakwell in the laundry room past his 90th birthday.

On 29 December 2016, Rimmington died at the age of 93. He was known as Rimmo or Mr Barnsley for his services to the local community.

On 30 December 2016, Barnsley announced that Rimmington was aware that he was to be awarded a British Empire Medal for services to the local community and football in the 2017 New Year Honours List. His family will receive the medal on his behalf.

Honours 

 Barnsley Hall of Fame

References

External links
 
 BBC Article

1923 births
2016 deaths
English footballers
Denaby United F.C. players
English Football League players
Barnsley F.C. players
Hartlepool United F.C. players
Recipients of the British Empire Medal
Association football goalkeepers
Barnsley F.C. non-playing staff